The 1968 Louisiana gubernatorial election was held on February 4, 1968. Incumbent Democratic Governor John McKeithen was re-elected to a second term in office. This was the first election in which the Governor was eligible for re-election to a second consecutive term, following a 1966 constitutional referendum. It was also the first election after passage of the Voting Rights Act of 1965, which brought thousands of African Americans into the electorate for the first time.

The 1967 primary election resulted in the overwhelming re-nomination of John McKeithen to his second consecutive term as governor, the result of a constitutional amendment approved by voters in 1966, which allows Louisiana governors to serve two  back-to-back terms.

On November 4, 1967, McKeithen won the Democratic primary with 80.64% of the vote. At this time the Louisiana Republican Party rarely fielded candidates (though they had in 1964), so the Democratic nomination was tantamount to victory. McKeithen won the general election without an opponent.

As of 2022, this is the last time an incumbent Democratic Governor of Louisiana carried all 64 parishes in his or her re-election.

Democratic primary

Candidates
 Frank Ahern
 Cy D. F. Courtney
 John McKeithen, incumbent Governor
 John Rarick, U.S. Representative from St. Francisville
 Addison Roswell Thompson, candidate for Governor in 1960 and 1964

Results

General election
This is the most recent time to date that there was no Republican running in the contest for governor.

Sources 
Louisiana Secretary of State.   Primary Election Returns, 1967

References 

1967
Louisiana
Gubernatorial
November 1967 events in the United States